Sultan Al Ghaferi (born 18 September 1986) is an Emirati professional footballer who plays as a midfielder for UAE Pro League club Al Dhafra. He transferred from Baniyas to Al Ain in the summer of 2013.

External links

References

1986 births
Living people
Baniyas Club players
Al Ain FC players
Al Wahda FC players
Al Jazira Club players
Al Dhafra FC players
People from Abu Dhabi
Emirati footballers
Association football midfielders
United Arab Emirates international footballers
UAE First Division League players
UAE Pro League players